USS Locust is a name used more than once by the U.S. Navy:

 , a tugboat placed in service 5 April 1910.
 , a net laying ship launched 1 February 1941.

References 

United States Navy ship names